The Chaldean Catholic Archeparchy of Urmiā (also spelled Urmia or called Rezayeh; informally called Urmyā of the Chaldeans) is a Metropolitan archeparchy (Eastern Catholic archdiocese) of the Chaldean Catholic Church (Syro-Oriental Rite in Syriac language) with seeing in Urmia, West Azerbaijan Province, north-west Iran.

Its cathedral archiepiscopal see is the Cathedral of St. Mary the Mother of God, in Urmia, Iran.

History 
Established on 4 September 1890 as the Metropolitan Archeparchy (archdiocese) of Urmyā, on territory previously without proper Ordinary for the rite's particular church sui iuris.

Province 
Its ecclesiastical province comprises the Metropolitan's own archeparchy and a single suffragan, the Chaldean Catholic Eparchy of Salmas. Currently, they are both maintained by the same Bishop, and population data for the suffragan are put down under the Archeparchy of Urmia. In effect, the Eparchy of Salmas is part of the Archeparchy of Urmia.

Episcopal ordinaries
(all Chaldean Rite)
Metropolitan Archeparchs of Urmyā
 Tommaso Audo (1892.09.04 – death 1918.07.27)
 Isaac-Jesu-Yab Khoudabache (Koudabache) (1930.10.25 – death 1939.08.08), previously Eparch of Salmas of the Chaldeans (Iran) (1894.10.01 – 1908); also again Eparch of suffragan see Salmas of the Chaldeans ([1930.10.06] 1930.10.25 – 1939.08.08)
 Abel Zayia, Lazarists [C.M.) (1939.12.06 – death 1951.03.18), also Archbishop-Bishop of Salmas of the Chaldeans (Iran) (1939.12.06 – 1951.03.18)
 Zaya Dachtou (1951.07.14 – death 1972.08.15), also Eparch of Salmas of the Chaldeans (Iran) (1951.07.14 – 1972.08.15)
 Samuel Chauriz, Order of Saint Jerome (O.S.H.) (1974.05.01 – death 1981.06.14), previously Archeparch of Ahvaz of the Chaldeans (Iran) (1972.01.18 – 1974.05.01; also Eparch of Salmas of the Chaldeans (Iran) (1974.05.01 – 1981.06.14)
 Thomas Meram (1983.11.30 – ...), also Eparch of Salmas of the Chaldeans (Iran) (1983.11.30 – ...), President of Iranian Episcopal Conference (2000 – 2003)

See also 
Catholic Church in Iran
Chaldean Catholic Church

References

External links 
 GCatholic, with incumbent biography links
 Official website

Chaldean Catholic dioceses
1890 establishments in Iran
Chaldean Catholic